The 1998 Kroger St. Jude International was a men's tennis tournament played on indoor hard courts at the Racquet Club of Memphis in Memphis, United States, that was part of the International Series Gold of the 1998 ATP Tour. It was the 28th edition of the tournament and was held from 16 February through 22 February 1998. Fourth-seeded Mark Philippoussis won the singles title.

Finals

Singles

  Mark Philippoussis defeated  Michael Chang, 6–3, 6–2.

Doubles

  Todd Woodbridge /  Mark Woodforde defeated  Ellis Ferreira /  David Roditi, 6–3, 6–4.

References

Kroger St. Jude International
U.S. National Indoor Championships
Kroger St. Jude International
Kroger St. Jude International
Kroger St. Jude International